Frederick Albert Clinton (March 1, 1834 - September 21, 1890) was a delegate to the 1868 South Carolina Constitutional Convention, state legislator, trial justice, and militia officer. He represented Lancaster County, South Carolina in the South Carolina Senate from 1868 to 1877. He was a Republican.

Before the American Civil War he was owned by Ervin (or Irvin) Clinton, a lawyer. In November 1870, P. B. Tompkins contested his election.

Isom Caleb Clinton, his older brother, was a bishop who assisted in founding the Mount Carmel A.M.E. Zion Church in Lancaster County. The Lancaster Ledger ran an obituary for him. Frederick Albert Clinton is buried in the graveyard on the church and campground's north side.

See also
African-American officeholders during and following the Reconstruction era

References

1834 births
1890 deaths
19th-century American politicians
19th-century American slaves
Republican Party South Carolina state senators
African-American state legislators in South Carolina
African-American politicians during the Reconstruction Era